WSOH is a radio station licensed to Zanesfield, Ohio broadcasting on 88.9 FM. WSOH airs a Christian contemporary music format and is owned by Soaring Eagle Promotions, Inc. The station operates in a simulcast with sister station WKEN.

On December 17, 2021, the station was rebranded as "Rise FM".

References

External links
WSOH's website

Contemporary Christian radio stations in the United States
SOH